Vilas Adinath Sangave (2 June 1920 – 1 March 2011) was an Indian sociologist and Jainologist. He was born to a Marathi Jain family in Solapur, Maharashtra. Sangave died at the age of 90.

Works

References

1920 births
2011 deaths
Indian sociologists
Scholars of Jainism
Marathi people